Space advocacy is supporting or advocating for a human use of outer space. Purposes advocated can reach from space exploration, or commercial use of space to even space settlement.  There are many different individuals and organizations dedicated to space advocacy. They are usually active in educating the public on space related subjects, lobbying governments for increased funding in space-related activities or supporting private space activities. They also recruit members, fund projects, and provide information for their membership and interested visitors. They are sub-divided into three categories depending on their primary work: practice, advocacy, and theory.

History 
The idea that space flight was possible and necessary was introduced by groups of thinkers, primarily members of the Russian, American, British, and German science communities, who formed in the 1920s the first advocacy groups.  Starting in the 1930s, these groups began to share their individual plans for a future in space to their respective governments and the public.

Influential books and other media began to emerge which included works containing illustrations by Chesley Bonestell (based on Wernher von Braun's designs) such as The Conquest of Space (1949) and magazine articles including the "Man Will Conquer Space Soon!" series of article in Colliers magazine between 1952 and 1954.  Television shows included Walt Disney's "Man in Space" and "Man and the Moon" in 1955, and "Mars and Beyond" in 1957.

Space movement 
According to Mark Hopkins from the National Space Society, each space organization has a different priority and short-term objective, but all organizations share the ultimate goal of building space settlements. In 2004 most of the leading US non-profit space organizations joined together to form the Space Exploration Alliance. The Alliance was formed to "advocate for the exploration and development of outer space" to members of Congress.  The Alliance organizes the annual Legislative Blitz to lobby members of Congress for space exploration, and every space enthusiast is encouraged to participate in the Legislative Blitz by calling, emailing, or personally visiting their Congressperson's office.

Decolonizing space 

To reach a more inclusive spaceflight and space science some organizations like the Justspace Alliance (see Lucianne Walkowicz) and IAU featured Inclusive Astronomy have been formed in recent years. Holding events like the unconference Decolonizing Mars in 2018.

Advocates of this issue see the need for inclusive and democratic participation and implementation of any space exploration, infrastructure or habitation. Questioning the decision making of and reasons for any colonial space policy,  labour and land exploitation with postcolonial critique.

Private and state funded advocacy for space colonization, specifically the rationales and politico-legal regimes behind space exploration, like the "New Frontier" slogan, have been criticized for applying settler colonialism and the manifest destiny ideology, perpetuating imperialism and the narrative of colonial exploration as fundamental to the assumed human nature.

Participation and representation of humanity in space is an issue of human access to and presence in space ever since the beginning of spaceflight. Even though some rights of non-spacefaring countries to partake in spaceflight have been secured through international space law, declaring space the "province of all mankind", understanding spaceflight as its resource, sharing of outer space for all humanity has been criticized as still imperialist and lacking. For example arguments for space as a solution to global problems like pollution and related narratives of survival are considered imperialist by Joon Yun. Having a considerate policy towards space is seen as an imperative to allow a thoroughly sustainable human society also on Earth.

Space ethics altogether has been around for decades, with contemporary representatives of the field, such as Tony Milligan, seeing an increasing need to more firmly establish it, particularly considering the urgent issue of space environmental protection.

List of organizations

Actively involved 
Organizations that are directly involved in space exploration, having their own active projects.

Lobbying 
Organizations that focus mainly on lobbying government agencies and businesses to step up their efforts.

Educating and publicizing 
Organisations involved in educating the public, to boost their understanding and enthusiasm about space.

Theorizing 
Organisations that focus on advocating theoretical work.

See also 

 Chinese exclusion policy of NASA
 NewSpace
 Politics of the International Space Station
 Space law
 Space Race
 Space policy
 Politics of outer space

References 

 
Advocacy